These are the Australian Country number-one albums of 2014, per the ARIA Charts.

See also
2014 in music
List of number-one albums of 2014 (Australia)

References

2014
Australia country albums
Number-one country albums